Michal Šimečka (born May 10, 1984 in Bratislava) is a Slovak politician, journalist and researcher who has served as Vice President of the European Parliament since 2022, and as a Member of the European Parliament since 2019. In 2020, Šimečka was elected as Vice President of the liberal fraction Renew Europe. On the Slovak domestic political scene, he is a co-founder of the social-liberal Progressive Slovakia party, leading it from 2022.

Early life and education 
Šimečka earned a bachelor's degree in political sciences and international relations from the Charles University in Prague in 2006. He then obtained an MPhil in Russian and East European Studies at St Antony's College at the University of Oxford in 2008, before moving to Nuffield College, where he received a DPhil in Politics and International Relations in 2012.

Early career
After his studies, Šimečka worked as a lecturer in Prague and Bratislava. He was an adviser on foreign policy in the European Parliament from 2011 to 2014. Šimečka also worked in the Centre for European Policy Studies in Brussels from 2013, before moving to the Institute of International Relations Prague as a researcher in 2015.

As a journalist, Šimečka wrote for the Slovak newspaper SME from 2002 to 2004, then for Financial Times from 2004 to 2006.

Member of the European Parliament, 2019–present
In parliament, Šimečka serves on the Committee on Civil Liberties, Justice and Home Affairs. In addition to his committee assignments, he is part of the parliament's delegations to the EU-Ukraine Parliamentary Association Committee and to the Euronest Parliamentary Assembly. He is also a member of the European Parliament Intergroup on LGBT Rights and the European Parliament Intergroup on Traditional Minorities, National Communities and Languages.

From 2020 until 2021, Šimečka served as deputy chair of the Renew Europe parliamentary group, under the leadership of chair Dacian Cioloș.

In November 2019, Šimečka was elected rapporteur on the establishment of an EU Mechanism on Democracy, the Rule of Law and Fundamental Rights. In October 2020, he presented his proposal for a mechanism combining several tools which monitor the respect of rule of law and European values, which received majority support in the European Parliament. Šimečka argued that the EU should do more to address the abuse of EU funding, writing that "an implicit bargain between net contributors and net recipients – we pay for market access, you are free to abuse funds" should end.

Personal life 
Šimečka is the son of journalist Martin Milan Šimečka and a grandson of philosopher, writer and dissident . He lives in Bratislava with his partner Soňa and their daughter Táňa.

References

External links 
Official Website 

1984 births
Living people
Politicians from Bratislava
Charles University alumni
Alumni of St Antony's College, Oxford
Alumni of Nuffield College, Oxford
Slovak journalists
Progressive Slovakia politicians
MEPs for Slovakia 2019–2024